Pacific Fleet station is a station on the Blue Line of the San Diego Trolley near Naval Base San Diego in San Diego, California. The stop provides civilian access to the naval base facility.

History

This station was renovated, starting October 2, 2013 as part of the Trolley Renewal Project; it reopened with a renovated station platform in mid August 2014.

Station layout
There are two tracks, each with a side platform.

See also
 List of San Diego Trolley stations

References

Blue Line (San Diego Trolley)
Railway stations in the United States opened in 1981
San Diego Trolley stations in San Diego
1981 establishments in California